Portrait of Countess Yekaterina von Engelhardt is a 1796 oil on canvas painting of Yekaterina von Engelhardt by Élisabeth Vigée Le Brun, produced in Saint Petersburg and now in the Louvre, which acquired it in 1966. It was exhibited in Saint Petersburg in 1905 as part of the exhibition Russian Portraits of the 18th and 19th Centuries.

Other versions
An earlier portrait of the same subject was produced by the artist in Naples in 1790 and is now in the musée Jacquemart-André in Paris.

References

Paintings by Élisabeth Vigée Le Brun
1796 paintings
von Engelhardt
Paintings in the Louvre by French artists
18th-century portraits